The South African Railways Class 7F 4-8-0 of 1913 was a steam locomotive.

In 1913, the New Cape Central Railway placed three Cape 7th Class  Mastodon type steam locomotives in service. In 1925, when the New Cape Central Railway was amalgamated into the South African Railways, these three locomotives were renumbered and designated Class 7F.

New Cape Central Railway
The New Cape Central Railway (NCCR) was formed in January 1893 when it purchased all the assets of the bankrupted Cape Central Railway (CCR), which had constructed a railway from Worcester via Robertson to Roodewal, now Ashton. In 1894, the NCCR began work to extend the line to Swellendam. From there it continued via Heidelberg to Riversdale, which was reached on 3 December 1903. Voorbaai, near Mosselbaai, was reached in 1904.

Unlike most other privately owned railways in South Africa, the NCCR prospered and was well and efficiently run. Prior to 1917 dividends were small, but from 1917 to 1925, dividends of 4½% were declared each year. The NCCR was the last component railway to be added to the South African Railways (SAR) when it was liquidated and amalgamated in May 1925. All the NCCR locomotives which came onto the SAR roster continued to give good service for many years.

Manufacturer
These last three NCCR 7th Class locomotives were ordered from and built by the North British Locomotive Company (NBL) in 1913, numbered in the range from NCCR 9 to 11.

Characteristics
The original Cape 7th Class had been designed in 1892 by H.M. Beatty, Cape Government Railways (Western System) Locomotive Superintendent. While there was little difference from the original 7th Class design as far as the main dimensions were concerned, these three locomotives were more modern in appearance.

Visually obvious alterations were the smokebox saddle and the running boards. The distinctive covered smokebox saddle of earlier 7th Class locomotives was replaced with an exposed one. The running boards were no longer straight all the way through from buffer beam to cab end, but dipped ahead of the smokebox and beneath the cab, giving it the appearance of a Hendrie-designed locomotive.

The NCCR locomotives were equipped with a larger coal capacity version of the Type ZC tender.

These locomotives were capable of hauling  from Ashton to Mosselbaai.

Class 7 sub-classes
When the NCCR was amalgamated into the SAR in 1925, these three  locomotives were renumbered in the range from 1357 to 1359 on the SAR roster and designated Class 7F. 

Other 7th Class locomotives which had come onto the SAR roster from the other railways in the Southern African region in 1912, namely the Cape Government Railways (CGR), Central South African Railways (CSAR), the Natal Government Railways (NGR) and the Rhodesia Railways (RR), as well as earlier NCCR 7th Class locomotive models, were grouped into six different sub-classes by the SAR, becoming SAR Classes 7 and 7A to 7E.

Service
By November 1953 two Class 7s, one of which was ex NCCR Class 7F no. 1357, were still shedded at Touws River to work the Makadas on the Ladismith branch. It probably remained there until it was withdrawn and scrapped in April 1958. Its two sister engines, numbers 1358 and 1359, had both been withdrawn and scrapped in April 1950. The tender to no. 1359 survived and is now plinthed with Class 7 no. 970 at Riversdale.

References

1510
1510
4-8-0 locomotives
2D locomotives
NBL locomotives
Cape gauge railway locomotives
Railway locomotives introduced in 1913
1913 in South Africa
Scrapped locomotives